Bluebird K7 is a jet engined hydroplane which Britain's Donald Campbell set seven world water speed records between 1955 and 1967. K7 was the first successful jet-powered hydroplane, and was considered revolutionary when launched in January 1955.

Design
Donald Campbell began his record-breaking career in 1949 following the death of his father, Sir Malcolm Campbell. Initially, he had been using his father's 1939-built Rolls-Royce 'R' type powered propeller-driven hydroplane Blue Bird K4 for his attempts, but he met with little success and suffered a number of frustrating setbacks. In 1951, K4, which had been modified to a prop-rider configuration to increase its performance potential, was destroyed after suffering a structural failure, when its V-drive gearbox sheared its mountings which were punched through the floor of the hull.

Following rival record breaker John Cobb's death in his jet boat Crusader, which broke up at over  during a record attempt in September 1952, Campbell began development of his own advanced all-metal jet-powered Bluebird K7 hydroplane to challenge the record, by then held by the American prop rider hydroplane Slo-Mo-Shun IV. Designed by Ken and Lew Norris, the K7 was a steel-framed, aluminium-bodied, three-point hydroplane, built at Samlesbury by Samlesbury Engineering, powered by a Metropolitan-Vickers Beryl axial-flow turbojet engine, producing 3500 pound-force (16 kN) of thrust. Like Slo-Mo-Shun, but unlike Cobb's tricycle Crusader, the three planing points were arranged with two forward and one aft, in a "pickle-fork" layout, prompting Bluebird'''s early comparison to a blue lobster. K7 was of very advanced design and construction, and its load-bearing steel space frame ultra rigid.

The designation "K7" was derived from its Lloyd's unlimited rating registration. It was carried on a prominent white roundel on its sponsons, underneath an infinity symbol. Bluebird K7 was the seventh boat registered at Lloyds in the 'Unlimited' series.

[[File:K7 Registration.jpg|thumb|K7s Lloyds Unlimited Hydroplane registration]]

 Bluebird K7 records 

Campbell set seven world water speed records in K7 between July 1955 and December 1964. The first of these marks was set at Ullswater on 23 July 1955, where he achieved a speed of 202.15 mph (324 km/h) but only after many months of trials and a major redesign of Bluebird'''s forward sponson attachments points. Subsequently, four new marks were registered on Coniston Water, where Campbell and Bluebird became an annual fixture in the later half of the fifties, enjoying significant sponsorship from the Mobil oil company and then BP. Campbell made an unsuccessful attempt in 1957 at Canandaigua in New York state in the summer of 1957, which failed due to lack of suitable calm water conditions. Bluebird K7 became a well known attraction, and as well as her annual Coniston appearances, K7 was displayed extensively in the UK, USA, Canada and Europe, and then subsequently in Australia during Campbell's prolonged attempt on the land speed record in 1963–64.

In order to extract more speed, and endow the boat with greater high speed stability, in both pitch and yaw, K7 was subtly modified in the second half of the 1950s to incorporate more effective streamlining with a blown Perspex cockpit canopy and fluting to the lower part of the main hull. In 1958, a small wedge shaped tail fin, housing an arrester parachute, modified sponson fairings, that gave a significant reduction in forward aerodynamic lift, and a fixed hydrodynamic stabilising fin, attached to the transom to aid directional stability, and exert a marginal down-force on the nose were incorporated into the design to increase the safe operating envelope of the hydroplane.

Campbell then turned his attention to the Land Speed Record, with the aim of establishing a land speed record of  plus. He also planned to set a seventh water speed record in the same year, and so become the first person to establish the land speed record and water speed record in the same year. He set out for the Bonneville Salt Flats in August 1960 and was lucky to survive a  crash in his Norris Brothers designed Bluebird CN7 turbine powered car later that September. Bluebird CN7 was rebuilt in 1961–62 and Campbell subsequently spent a frustrating two years in the Australian desert, battling adverse track conditions.

This latest success made Campbell and K7 the world's most prolific holders of the water speed record, and in addition Campbell realised his 'double' when he became the first, and so far only, person to break both the land speed record and the water speed record in the same year. Following on from this success, Campbell stated that K7 would be most likely retired and become a museum exhibit.

Donald Campbell's speed records

Final record attempt and death of Donald Campbell
In June 1966, Campbell decided to once more try for a water speed record with K7: his target, 300 mph (480 km/h).

To add more power, Campbell received a 4,500 pound-force (20 kN) Bristol Siddeley Orpheus engine on loan from the Ministry of Defence. This was both lighter and more powerful than the original engine. Campbell also purchased a crash-damaged Folland Gnat, which used the Orpheus engine, as a source of spare parts. The vertical stabiliser from the Gnat was also used on the rebuilt K7, and a new hydraulic water brake designed to slow the boat down on the five-mile Coniston course.

The boat returned to Coniston for trials in November 1966. These did not go well; the weather was appalling and K7 destroyed her engine when the air intakes collapsed under the demands of the more powerful engine, and debris was drawn into the compressor blades. The engine was replaced, using the engine from the Gnat aircraft that he had purchased at the project's start. The original Orpheus remained outside the team's lakeside workshop for the rest of the project, shrouded in a tarpaulin.

By the end of November, after further modifications to alter K7's weight distribution, some high-speed runs were made, but these were timed at well below the existing record. Problems with the fuel system meant that the engine could not develop maximum power. By the middle of December, Campbell had made a number of timed attempts, but the highest speed achieved was 264 mph, and therefore still shy of the existing record. Eventually, further modifications to K7's fuel system (involving the fitting of a booster pump) fixed the fuel-starvation problem. It was now the end of December and Campbell was all set to proceed, pending only the arrival of suitable weather conditions.

Final runs

On 4 January 1967, Campbell mounted his record attempt. Instead of refuelling and waiting for the wash of this run to subside, as had been pre-arranged, he then decided to make the return run immediately.

However her stability had begun to break down as she travelled at a speed she had never achieved before, and the front of the boat started to bounce out of the water on the starboard side. 150 yards from the end of the measured kilometre, K7 lifted from the surface and after about 1.5 seconds, gradually lifted from the water at an ever-increasing angle, then took off at a 90-degree angle to the water surface. She somersaulted and plunged back into the lake, nose first, then cartwheeled across the water before coming to rest. The impact broke K7 forward of the air intakes (where Campbell was sitting) and the main hull sank shortly afterwards.

Campbell had been killed instantly. Mr Whoppit, his teddy bear mascot, was found among the floating debris and his helmet was recovered. Royal Navy divers were able to locate the wreck of K7, but called off the search for Campbell's body after two weeks.

Campbell's last words, recorded from the radio intercom, were:

Accident analysis

There are varying theories about the cause of the crash. Not waiting to refuel meant the boat was lighter. The wash from the first run would have been made worse by use of the water brake; however, the wash had not had time to reflect back to the centre of the course, and Campbell had used the water brake well to the south. The still photographs taken of the latter part of the final run clearly show that the water brake was not deployed then, and also that when K7 became airborne, the jet engine was no longer functioning; the exhaust would have very noticeably disturbed the water. The engine had therefore flamed out. It is impossible to be certain why; fuel starvation, damage to a structural element during the bouncing, disturbance of the airstream into the intakes during pitching, or a combination of causes are all possible. The most likely ultimate cause is that Bluebird exceeded its aerodynamic static stability limit, with loss of engine thrust, damage to the port spar fairing, and the then little understood ground-effect lift enhancement all adding to the instability.

Recovery of Bluebird K7

The wreckage of Bluebird was discovered on the lake bed on 5 January 1967. A 10-man Royal Navy diving team led by Lt Cdr RN John Futcher, had arrived at Coniston late on the day of the accident. They set off for their first attempt to locate Donald Campbell and Bluebird at 12.30pm the next day. Futcher believed that Campbell's body would be either at the point of impact, in the main wreckage of the boat, or at a point between the two locations. Ken Norris had made some calculations to guide the dive team to the boat's likely resting point.

The first three dives that afternoon found small pieces of wreckage, indicating the dive team were on the correct track. On the fourth dive, the main hull of K7 was found in 142 feet of water, resting in her correct attitude but facing to the south-east. A subsequent and prolonged search located many pieces of wreckage, and various items were brought to the surface including Bluebirds broken steering wheel and column.

However, the body of Donald Campbell was not located, and the search was called off on 16 January. The Campbell family and team let it be known that they did not wish to have the hull of K7 recovered in the absence of finding Campbell's body. They also felt they would learn nothing from its recovery. The wreck sat on the lake bed for a further 34 years, its location known by a few people but never disclosed.

A diving team led by Bill Smith was responsible for relocating the wreckage and its subsequent recovery was handled by Smith's Bluebird Project team. The wreckage was recovered between October 2000, when the first small sections were raised, and May 2001, when Campbell's body was finally recovered. The largest section, representing approximately two-thirds of the main hull, was salvaged on 8 March 2001.

Controversy over the recovery 
The exact date of the retrieval of Campbell's body from the lake was 28 May 2001. He was interred in Coniston cemetery on 12 September that year after a funeral service at St Andrews Church in Coniston.

Campbell's sister Jean Wales had been against the recovery of the boat and her brother's body out of respect for his stated wish that, in the event of something going wrong: "Skipper and boat stay together." This quotation is usually said to have been uttered by Campbell when, in the final week of 1964, he was waiting for good weather to attempt a record run, but a bid seemed so unlikely at that point, his colleagues were pressing him to leave. He refused, and broke the record on the last day of 1964. Jean Wales did not attend his burial or visit his grave although she did remain in daily contact with the salvage crew as the boat's wreckage was being brought ashore.

Forensic examination and causes of the accident 
Because the boat's water brake was found to be extended when the wreck was recovered, it was generally assumed that Campbell had activated it to slow down before the boat had left the water on his final run.  On dismantling the boat, however, a hydraulic accumulator from the donor Gnat aircraft was discovered to be still connected to the system, meaning that stored hydraulic pressure may well have deployed the brake after the accident.

The boat still contained fuel in the engine fuel lines and a quantity was collected and analysed using gas chromatography as part of the official investigation of the accident commissioned by Barrow Coroner. However, insufficient evidence was present to completely discount the fuel starvation theory. The engine could have cut-out as a result of intermittent fuel starvation caused by the untried fuel system or failure of the electrical supply to the low-pressure fuel-boost pumps. Full details of the boat's strip-down, and the conclusions drawn from it by the investigators, are lodged within the public domain in the diary pages of the Bluebird Project website.

Restoration and future running 
On Thursday 7 December 2006, Gina Campbell, Donald's daughter, formally gifted the recovered wreckage of Bluebird K7 to the Ruskin Museum in Coniston on behalf of the Campbell Family Heritage Trust. In agreement with the Campbell Family Heritage Trust and the museum, Bill Smith is to organise the restoration of the boat, which is now under way. Now the joint property of the Ruskin Museum and The Bluebird Project, the intention is to rebuild K7 back to running order circa 4 January 1967. Bill Smith has said that this will take an undisclosed number of years to accomplish. Gina Campbell commented: "I've decided to secure the future of Bluebird for the people of Coniston, the Ruskin Museum and the people of the world". Museum Director Vicky Slowe spoke of Gina's generosity and then said: "Bill Smith has assured us he can get Bluebird fully conserved and reconfigured at no cost to the museum. , K7 is being fully restored by The Bluebird Project, to a very high standard of working condition in North Shields, Tyne and Wear, using a significant proportion of her original fabric, but with a replacement BS Orpheus engine of the same type albeit incorporating many original components."

As of May 2009 permission has been given for a one-off set of proving trials of Bluebird on Coniston Water, where she will be tested to a safe speed for demonstration purposes only. There is no fixed date for completion of Bluebird K7 or the trials. K7 will be housed in her own purpose built wing at the Ruskin Museum in Coniston once she is returned to her spiritual home.

On 20 March 2018 the restoration was featured on the BBC's The One Show, where it was announced that Bluebird K7 would return to the water on Loch Fad, on the Isle of Bute in Scotland, in August 2018 for handling trials.

On 3 September 2021, it was announced that relations between the Ruskin Museum and Bill Smith had broken down to the point where the remaining option is for the restored boat to be broken into two parts (its original recovered section and the new restored section) in order to resolve the parties dispute.

Refloating and initial trials
In August 2018, initial restoration work on Bluebird was completed. She was transported to Loch Fad where she was refloated on 4 August 2018. For safety reasons, there are no plans to attempt to reach any higher speeds.

See also
 Across the Lake a 1988 BBC TV drama about Campbell starring Anthony Hopkins.

References

External links

 Bluebirdproject.com - the restoration project for K7
 1967 Pathe News item about the crash

Bluebird record-breaking vehicles
Water speed records
Jet-powered hydroplanes
Maritime incidents in 1955
Maritime incidents in 1967